Zeithain is a municipality in the district of Meißen, in Saxony, Germany.

Historically, it is known for the Zeithain Encampment (Zeithainer Zeltlager or Zeithainer Lustlager), which was a huge agglomeration of tents and troops, involving the whole 27,000-men-strong army of August the Strong. This event took place from 1 to 26 June 1730.

During World War II a large prisoner-of-war camp, Stalag IV-B/H, was located in Zeithain.
A memorial and museum commemorate it.

Municipality subdivisions
Zeithain includes the following subdivisions:
Cottewitz
Gohlis
Jacobsthal
Kreinitz
Lorenzkirch
Moritz
Neudorf
Promnitz
Röderau-Bobersen
Zschepa

Mayor 
In 2021 Mirko Pollmer was elected mayor.

Gallery

Twin towns
 Teningen, Germany

References

Meissen (district)